The S&P/TOPIX 150 Index is a stock market index of Japanese stocks from Standard & Poor's.

It is a part of the S&P Global 1200.

Investing 
This index is tracked by iShares Japan Large-Cap (ITF).

See also 

 Nikkei 225
 TOPIX

References

External links
 

Japanese stock market indices
S&P Dow Jones Indices